The Halocyprida is one of the two orders within the Myodocopa, in turn a subclass of the ostracods. Like their relatives in the order Myodocopida, they have a long exopod on the second antenna. However, unlike myodocopids, their fifth appendage is leg-like rather than modified for feeding, their seventh limb is reduced or absent, and they have no lateral eyes. The group is primarily planktonic. There are two suborders: Halocypridina and Cladocopina.

References

External links
An Atlas of Southern Ocean Planktonic Ostracods

 
Crustacean orders